Midvinterblot is the eighth studio album by the Swedish death metal band Unleashed. It was released in 2006 by Steamhammer Records (a division of SPV Records).

Track listing

The song "Age of the Warrior" is made with the titles of all Unleashed albums previous to Midvinterblot: Where No Life Dwells, Across the Open Sea, Shadows in the Deep, Victory, Warrior, Hell's Unleashed, and Sworn Allegiance.

References

External links
 Reviews for Midvinterblot

Unleashed (band) albums
2006 albums
SPV/Steamhammer albums